The Claustulaceae are a family of fungi in the Phallales order. The family contains four genera and ten species. The family was circumscribed by mycologist Gordon Herriot Cunningham in 1939.

References

External links

Phallales
Basidiomycota families